Diona Doherty (born 1989) is a Northern Irish actress, writer and comedian from Derry. She starred in BBC Northern Ireland's Soft Border Patrol. She played a Ukrainian student in an episode of Channel 4's Derry Girls. She has been a panellist on The Blame Game, since 2021.

Career
Doherty has frequently worked with Hole in the Wall Gang, as a writer and member of the cast of BBC Radio Ulster's satirical sketch show A Perforated Ulster since 2020, working with Tim McGarry on The Blame Game since 2021, a regular role of Derry girl Gráinne in Give My Head Peace, and a member of the revamped Dry Your Eyes cast in 2022. She competed in 2021's BBC New Comedy Award, making it to the Northern Irish final.

Personal life
Doherty is married to Northern Irish comic Sean Hegarty. They have one daughter, and Hegarty has children from a previous relationship.

References

External links

1989 births
Living people
Date of birth missing (living people)
Television actresses from Northern Ireland
Women comedians from Northern Ireland